Windows 2.1 is a major release of Microsoft Windows. It was released to manufacturing on May 27, 1988, as a successor to Windows 2.0.

It was released with two different variants with differing CPU compatibility, also known as Windows/286 and Windows/386, so the versions are considered to be similar to its predecessor. In comparison, the Windows/386 variant is considered to be better than the 286 one, since it provides support for EMS emulation and is designed to use both conventional and extended memory. Changes to the user interface did not occur in this version, and rather, its performance was increased and enhanced memory management was added. The version is also noted to be the first one to require a hard disk drive. A minor update version, Windows 2.11, was released in March 1989.

Enhancements that were introduced were considered to have improved the operating environment, while the Windows/386 variant was noted to have a good level of functionality. It was considered to be one of the most popular 80386-based systems. The sales of Microsoft Windows continued to go up after its release, and in May 1990, it was succeeded by Windows 3.0, which is considered to be the first Windows version to perform well both critically and commercially. Microsoft ended its support on December 31, 2001.

Release versions

Windows 2.1 
Like its predecessor, Windows 2.0, the operating environment was released with two different variants with differing CPU compatibility. However, the cosmetic naming convention was changed to "Windows/286" and "Windows/386". It was released on May 27, 1988, and it was the first version of Windows to require a hard disk drive.

Despite its name, Windows/286 was fully operational on an 8088 or 8086 processor, although, it would not use the high memory area since it did not exist on an 8086 processor. It is a rehash of its predecessor, Windows 2.03. The variant uses additional 64KB of the extended 286 KB memory in real mode. To access the additional memory, HIMEM.SYS is needed. A few PC vendors shipped Windows/286 with Intel 8086 hardware; one such example was IBM's PS/2 Model 25, which included Windows/286, resulting in some customer confusion.

The other variant, Windows/386, is more advanced since it had introduced a protected mode kernel, and it allows several MS-DOS programs to run in a parallel in "virtual 8086" CPU mode, rather than suspending background applications. It has also provided support for EMS emulation, to make the RAM beyond the 640 KB limit. It has spruced-up rendering of the 80386 version, and its setup program is considered to be better than the Windows/286 one. Windows/386 is designed to use both conventional and extended memory, although it ignores expanded memory. The facilities for converting extended memory into expanded memory are built into Windows/386, although, any EMS that is separately controlled would not be available on Windows/386. To customize Windows/386, users would have to manually change the CONFIG.SYS file. Microsoft ended its support for Windows 2.1 on December 31, 2001.

Windows 2.11 
Windows 2.11 was released on March 13, 1989. As the successor of Windows 2.1, it was also released in Windows/286 and Windows/386 editions, with some minor changes in memory management and updates regarding printing options. It was noted that costs for organizations that ran Windows 2.11 were lower.

Features 
Changes to the user interface did not occur in this version, and instead, Microsoft had increased its performance and added enhanced memory management. The Windows/286 variant introduced LIM 4.0 boards to store and swap executable code. Both variants had also introduced support towards more devices, while its printer support has been improved. Windows/386 allows sharing a single printer to multiple windows. Microsoft has also introduced a disk-caching program, SmartDrive, while third-party developers had introduced more apps to Windows 2.1 and 2.11.

System requirements 
The official system requirements for Windows 2.1 include the following:

Windows 2.1 is shipped with 1.2 MB 5¼-inch or 720K 3½-inch floppy disks. The Windows/386 variant also comes with user's guides, a quick-reference card and a manual that explains the features of the 386 variant.

Reception 
The enhancements that were introduced in Windows 2.1 are considered to have had improved the operating environment. The Windows/386 variant has good level of functionality, and it lets applications run in full- or partial-screen windows, while the operating environment also slows down when running graphic-based applications. InfoWorld rated Windows/386 an excellent value. Alongside DESQview 386, they were considered to be the most popular 386 environments by 1989, although DESQview 386 is considered to be more flexible than Windows/386. Compared to other 80386-based systems, Windows/386 requires less DOS memory.

By January 1990, the sales of Microsoft Windows had reached less than two million. It was succeeded by Windows 3.0 released in 1990, and after that, Windows 3.1 in 1992, and is considered to be the first version of Microsoft Windows to perform well both critically and commercially.

See also
 LOADALL
 DESQview 386

References

External links
 Microsoft Windows Version History 
 YouTube upload of Windows/386 promotion video 

1988 software
Products and services discontinued in 2001
2.1x
History of Microsoft
History of software
Products introduced in 1988
DOS software